Tej Singh is an Indian politician who is the founder and president of Ambedkar Samaj Party. He is also commander of "Bahujan Swemsewak Sangthan".

References

People from Etah district
People from Uttar Pradesh
Year of birth missing (living people)
Living people
Political party founders